, officially abbreviated as , is a Japanese adult visual novel developed by Madosoft and was released for Windows on April 28, 2016. It was ported to the PlayStation Vita. An English version of the visual novel was released by Sekai Project in July 2017. A 12-episode anime television series adaptation animated by AXsiZ aired between April and June 2016. A sequel to the visual novel titled Wagamama High Spec Over Clock was released in August 2017. The sequel was announced at the Comic Market 91 event on December 29, 2016.

Gameplay

Wagamama High Spec is a romance visual novel in which the player assumes the role of Kōki Narumi. Much of its gameplay is spent on reading the story's narrative and dialogue. The text in the game is accompanied by character sprites, which represent who Kōki is talking to, over background art. Throughout the game, the player encounters CG artwork at certain points in the story, which take the place of the background art and character sprites. The game follows a branching plot line with multiple endings, and depending on the decisions that the player makes during the game, the plot will progress in a specific direction.

There are four main plot lines that the player will have the chance to experience, one for each heroine. Throughout gameplay, the player is given multiple options to choose from, and text progression pauses at these points until a choice is made. Some decisions can lead the game to end prematurely, which offer an alternative ending to the plot. To view all plot lines in their entirety, the player will have to replay the game multiple times and choose different choices to further the plot to an alternate direction. Throughout gameplay, there are scenes with sexual CGs depicting Kōki and a given heroine having sex.

Plot
Kōki secretly acts as a manga author under the name "Imosarada" (literally Potato Salad), with spending his ordinary school life. Kaoruko Rokuonji is a female student at Ōsui Academy. She is from a good family and serves the student council president. At the start of the story, there is not any relationship between Kōki and Kaoruko in the school.

One day, Kaoruko finds out that Kōki is "Imosarada" due to an unexpected event. Kaoruko calls Kōki at the student council room and confides her secret to him. Actually, she is "Shika-kun", an illustrator drawing illustrations of Kōki manga. As she is searching for male members for the student council at that time, Kaoruko suggests to Kōki that he should join the council. Although the council's vice president, Ashe R. Sakuragi, strongly opposes Kōki's joining, he becomes a member of the council to help Kaoruko.   
       
After Kōki's joining, his younger sister, Toa Narumi, and his sister's best friend, Mihiro Miyase, also join the student council. In this way, Kōki comes to be involved in various tasks with the four girls: Kaoruko, Ashe, Toa, and Mihiro.

Characters

Main characters

A second-year student of Ōsui Academy. He secretly acts as a manga author under the pen name  and serializes a romantic comedy manga titled  in a magazine named .

 (game), Mariko Honda (anime)
A third-year student and the student council president of Ōsui Academy. She has a kind personality and is respected by other students. She secretly acts as an illustrator under the pen name  and has drawn illustrations for Kōki's manga since a year before. Kōki and Kaoruko did not initially know their real names and identities, because they were always contacted through their editor and had never met directly.

 (game), Megu Sakuragawa (anime)
A second-year student and the student council vice president. She is good at playing the piano as her parents are musicians, and currently aims to be a composer. She has a strong personality and thinks of Kōki as her rival. She has a large appetite.

 (game), Mai Gotō (anime)
Kōki's younger sister and a first-year student. She is good at computer programming and can develop application software by herself. She has a quiet and lazy personality and often plays truant from school. She knows that Kōki is a manga author. She is a fan of Shika-kun.
 

 (game), Chiyo Ōsaki (anime)
A first-year student and Toa's best friend. She is good at cuisine as her family runs a yōshoku restaurant. She is a bit mischievous and often enjoys teasing Kōki. She also knows that Kōki is a manga author. She placed first at this year's entrance examination.

Other characters

 (game)
A second-year student and Kōki's classmate. She is the class representative of Kōki's class and sits the next to Kōki in the classroom. She is the vice president of the school's drama club and hopes for Kaoruko and Ashe to join the club.

 (game)
An editor at the manga magazine Weekly Shōnen Champ. She is responsible for Deredere Scramble, the manga written by Imosarada (Kōki) and illustrated by Shika-kun (Kaoruko).
 

 (game)
A social studies teacher at Ōsui Academy. She is a homeroom teacher of Kōki's class and an advisor at the student council.

 (game)
A first-year student who is a classmate of Toa and Mihiro. He often gets mistaken for a girl due to his lovely face and small stature.

 (game)
A second-year student and Kōki's classmate. He is popular among the school's girls but does not have any girlfriend because he likes fat women and is not interested in slender girls.

 (game)
A second-year student and Kōki's classmate. He is not popular among the school's girls because he likes eroge/galge and is a bit pervert. Kōki and Masato nickname him as  after his surname.

Development and release

Wagamama High Spec is Madosoft's third game after Namaiki Delation in July 2013, and Yakimochi Stream in September 2014. The game's first news was released in June 2015. The game's character design was provided by Tsumire Utsunomiya; super deformed illustrations was provided by Nanateru. The scenario was written by five authors; Mojasubii, Ryūsuke Mutsu, Nissy, Coyote Hayama, and Hato. Hato is a scenario writer of Nora, Princess, and Stray Cat, developed by Harukaze. The game's theme song is "Miracle Heart!!", sung by Haruna Ōshima and composed by Yūya Saitō. The design direction was provided by Cao.

The game's free trial version became available for download on December 24, 2015 in Japan, and a prologue was released on February 4, 2016. The game's full version was released on April 28, 2016 for Windows.<ref name="ann20150925">{{cite web|url=http://www.animenewsnetwork.com/news/2015-09-25/wagamama-high-spec-tv-anime-visual-novel-both-debut-in-april-2016/.93367|title=Wagamama High Spec'''s TV Anime, Visual Novel Both Debut in April 2016|website=Anime News Network|date=September 25, 2015|accessdate=January 15, 2016}}</ref> A PlayStation Vita port was released by iMel on July 27, 2017. An English version was released by Sekai Project on July 25, 2017 for Windows and is distributed on Steam.

A sequel developed by Madosoft titled Wagamama High Spec Over Clock'' was released on August 25, 2017 for Windows.

Adaptations

Anime

A 12-episode anime television series adaptation was produced by AXsiZ, directed by Satoshi Shimizu, written by Kōjirō Nakamura, and the character design was provided by Masashi Nomura. It aired between April 11 and June 27, 2016 on Tokyo MX and Sun TV as a series of five-minute shorts. The series will be released on Blu-ray in Japan on August 26, 2016. The anime's ending theme is  sung by Haruna Ōshima. The single containing the theme song was released on June 22, 2016.

An Internet radio show to promote the anime titled  aired six episodes between April 6 and June 15, 2016. The show was produced by the Internet radio station "Onsen" and was streamed online every other Wednesday. It is hosted by Mai Gotō, the voice actress of Toa Narumi.

References

External links
 at Madosoft 
Anime official website 

2016 video games
Anime television series based on video games
AXsiZ
Bishōjo games
Comedy-drama anime and manga
Crunchyroll anime
Eroge
High school-themed video games
PlayStation Vita games
School life in anime and manga
Video games developed in Japan
Visual novels
Windows games